This is a list of New Mexico Lobos football seasons. The Lobos are part of the National Collegiate Athletic Association (NCAA) Division I Football Bowl Subdivision (FBS). Since their inception in 1892, the Lobos have played in over 1,100 games in over a century of play, including 13 bowl games, with interruptions occurring in 1895–1898, 1900 and 1902. They are a charter member of the Mountain West Conference (MWC), which they have been a part of since 1999. Prior to the Lobos joining the conference, they were a member of the Border Conference from 1931 to 1951, the Mountain States Conference (also known as the Skyline Conference) from 1952 to 1961, and the Western Athletic Conference (WAC) from 1962 to 1998. The Lobos have had brief spurts of success, with the Lobos having won four conference titles and two division titles.

Seasons

References

New Mexico

New Mexico Lobos football seasons